Good Samaritan University Hospital (formerly Good Samaritan Hospital Medical Center) is a 537-bed non-profit teaching hospital on Long Island located in West Islip, New York. The hospital contains 100 nursing home beds as well as operates an adult and pediatric Level II trauma center. Good Samaritan University Hospital opened in May 1959, and has expanded several times since opening. It has been Magnet-designed for its quality nursing since 2006, and is a member of Catholic Health. The hospital is also a major regional clinical campus for clinical clerkships and postgraduate medical training affiliated with the New York Institute of Technology College of Osteopathic Medicine, one of the largest medical schools in the United States.

History
Good Samaritan University Hospital was established by the Daughters of Wisdom. It opened on May 18, 1959 on a 60-acre parcel adjacent to the Great South Bay.

From 1963 to 1967, Robert Moses was the chairperson for the hospital's annual ball. On July 29, 1981, Robert Moses died at Good Samaritan at age 92.

It has undergone major expansions six times: to the east in 1966; to the south with the 120-bed Baxter Pavilion in 1970; to the west with two additional patient floors in 1973; to the north in 1983 with a five-story addition which included eight new operating rooms and new radiology and pediatric departments; and in 1996 with a four-story addition for the teaching, mammography, pathology and surgical programs.

The sixth expansion, begun in 1998, was a new two-story structure connected to the main building by a corridor. The Center for Emergency Medicine and Trauma, which was dedicated on April 22, 2001, encompasses the first floor.

In February 1980, Good Samaritan acquired the former Sayville Nursing Home for elderly patients who could no longer live home alone. The structure at the corner of Elm and Candee Avenues was totally refurbished as the Good Samaritan Nursing Home with skilled nursing facilities for 100 patient-residents.

In 1992, the West Islip Breast Cancer Coalition asked Good Samaritan to open a breast cancer center, and in February 1994, Good Samaritan opened its Breast Health Center. It became Long Island's first comprehensive breast health center. According to The New York Times, the center offers mammography examinations, biopsies, surgeries, after care, counseling, a boutique, and support groups. In 1997, the Breast Health Center was one of four places in the United States that was conducting clinical trials for new filmless digital mammography technology.

In 1997, the Bishop John R. McGann of the Rockville Centre diocese dismissed the separate boards operating Good Samaritan University Hospital, St. Francis Hospital & Heart Center, Mercy Hospital, and St. Charles Hospital and Rehabilitation Center, and placed the four hospitals under the management of the newly created Catholic Health Services of Long Island in response in changes in the health care industry and in order to aid the poor and needy.

In 2018, Catholic Health and Good Samaritan University Hospital entered into an agreement with the New York Institute of Technology College of Osteopathic Medicine to expand its number of seats for the college's osteopathic medical students to do medical rotations as well as pursue residencies and fellowships after students graduate. The agreement also offered expanded clerkship opportunities at all of Catholic Health Services' six hospitals.

Investigation of Richard Angelo, "Angel of Death" 
In 1987, American serial killer Richard Angelo was arrested following a urinalysis which showed elevated levels of Pavulon and Anectine. Later testing confirmed by Good Samaritan Hospital determined that Angelo's other victims were also positive for the same drugs. The hospital's investigations led to the subsequent charge of Angelo with multiple counts of second-degree murder and the killer's life sentence.

Graduate medical education

Good Samaritan University Hospital operates a number of medical residency programs accredited by the Accreditation Council for Graduate Medical Education (ACGME) with osteopathic recognition. Good Samaritan  hosts residency programs in family medicine, pediatrics, physical medicine and rehabilitation, obstetrics & gynecology, and emergency medicine.  Good Samaritan Hospital also operates a fellowship in minimally-invasive gynecologic surgery. The hospital runs a podiatry residency, which trains newly graduated podiatrists. The hospital provides clinical rotations for medical students from the New York Institute of Technology College of Osteopathic Medicine.

References
Notes

External links
Official website

Christian hospitals
Hospitals in New York (state)
Hospitals established in 1959
Hospital buildings completed in 1959
Buildings and structures in Suffolk County, New York
1959 establishments in New York (state)